Doi Tao is a district (amphoe) in the southern part of Chiang Mai province in northern Thailand.

Geography
Neighboring districts are (from the west clockwise) Om Koi, Hot of Chiang Mai Province, Li of Lamphun province and Sam Ngao of Tak province.

The south end of the Khun Tan Range reaches the east side of this district.

History
The minor district (king amphoe) was established on 16 October 1972 by splitting off the four tambons Tha Duea, Doi Tao, Muet Ka, and Ban Aen from Hot district. It was upgraded to a full district on 25 March 1979.

Administration
The district is divided into six sub-districts (tambons), which are further subdivided into 42 villages (muban). Tha Duea is a township (thesaban tambon) which covers parts of tambons Tha Duea and Mueat Ka. There are a further five tambon administrative organizations (TAO).

References

External links
amphoe.com

Doi Tao